Wy-dit-Joli-Village is a commune in the Val-d'Oise department and Île-de-France region of France.

Name
The name Wy comes from the Latin vicus – meaning "village" or cluster of houses (as opposed to a villa, an isolated farm and master's residence).

The full name Wy-dit-Joli-Village ("Wy-called-Pretty-Village") is said to have arisen from an incident in which King Henry IV of France, hunting in the area and enquiring what the settlement was called, exclaimed Ah! Quel joli village! : "Oh, what a pretty village!"

Geography

Climate

Wy-dit-Joli-Village has a oceanic climate (Köppen climate classification Cfb).

Population

See also
Communes of the Val-d'Oise department

References

External links

Association of Mayors of the Val d'Oise 

Communes of Val-d'Oise